"Stand in the Rain" is a song by Christian rock band Superchick from their 2006 album Beauty From Pain 1.1. It was released as a radio single that year, and stayed at number 1 on R&R's Christian CHR chart for 13 consecutive weeks beginning in October 2006. It was the 18th most played song on United States CHR radio stations in 2007. The instrumental was used in the trailer for Season 5 part 2 of MTV's The Hills. "Stand in the Rain" is a downloadable song for the video game Rock Band 2. The song was included on WOW Hits 2008.

References

2007 singles
Superchick songs
2006 songs